Granzyme A (CTLA3, HuTPS, T-cell associated protease 1, cytotoxic T lymphocyte serine protease, TSP-1, T-cell derived serine proteinase) is an enzyme. that in humans is encoded by the GZMA gene, and is one of the five granzymes encoded in the human genome . This enzyme is present in cytotoxic T lymphocyte granules.

Cytolytic T lymphocytes (CTL) and natural killer (NK) cells share the remarkable ability to recognize, bind, and lyse specific target cells. They are thought to protect their host by lysing cells bearing on their surface 'nonself' antigens, usually peptides or proteins resulting from infection by intracellular pathogens. The protein described here is a T cell- and natural killer cell-specific serine protease that may function as a common component necessary for lysis of target cells by cytotoxic T lymphocytes and natural killer cells.

This enzyme catalyses the following chemical reaction:

Hydrolysis of proteins, including fibronectin, type IV collagen and nucleolin. Preferential cleavage: -Arg-, -Lys- >> -Phe- in small molecule substrates.

Human Granzyme Genes

See also 
 GZMA

References

Further reading

External links 
 

EC 3.4.21